Deborah A. Sivas is an American environmental lawyer currently the Luke W. Cole Professor at Stanford Law School. Her current concerns are environmental litigation, responsibility and protection.

References

Year of birth missing (living people)
Living people
American environmental lawyers
Stanford Law School faculty
University of California, Davis alumni
Stanford Law School alumni
American legal scholars